is a Japanese conductor.

Biography
Born into a musical family, he studied piano at the Toho Gakuen School of Music, but was fascinated by the conducting activities of a fellow student, Seiji Ozawa. He decided to study conducting with Hideo Saito. In 1974, Akiyama made his debut with the Tokyo Symphony, and within two months, he was named the orchestra's Music Director and Permanent Conductor.

He has held a number of conducting posts internationally:
Assistant Conductor of the Toronto Symphony Orchestra (1968–1969)
Music Director of the American Symphony Orchestra (1973–1978)
Music Director (1964–2004) and Conductor Laureate (2004 to date) of the Tokyo Symphony Orchestra (1964–2004)
Music Director (1972–1985) and Conductor Laureate (1985 to date) of the Vancouver Symphony Orchestra (1972–1985) 
Music Director (1985–1993) and Conductor Emeritus (1993 to date) of the Syracuse Symphony Orchestra
Principal Conductor and Music Advisor of the Hiroshima Symphony Orchestra (1998 to date)
Principal Conductor and Music Advisor of the Kyushu Symphony
Principal Guest Conductor of the Edmonton Symphony Orchestra (2004–2005)

With the Tokyo Symphony, he conducted the Japanese premieres of Schoenberg's Moses und Aron, John Adams' El Niño and Lachenman's The Little Match Girl.

Akiyama is the recipient of the 1974 Suntory Music Award. In 2001, Akiyama was awarded the Emperor’s Purple Ribbon Medal from the Japanese Government for his outstanding contribution to the country's musical culture.

Links
Vancouver Symphony Society (Kazuyoshi Akiyama)
KAJIMOTO

References

1941 births
21st-century conductors (music)
Japanese conductors (music)
Japanese male conductors (music)
Living people
Musicians from Tokyo
Recipients of the Medal with Purple Ribbon
Toho Gakuen School of Music alumni
21st-century Japanese male musicians